Daun is a collective municipality (Verbandsgemeinde) in the Vulkaneifel district of Rhineland-Palatinate, Germany. The seat of the Daun Verbandsgemeinde is in the municipality of Daun.

Constituent municipalities

 Betteldorf
 Bleckhausen
 Brockscheid
 Darscheid
 Daun
Demerath 
Deudesfeld 
Dockweiler 
Dreis-Brück 
Ellscheid 
Gefell
Gillenfeld 
Hinterweiler 
Hörscheid 
Immerath 
Kirchweiler
Kradenbach 
Mehren 
Meisburg 
Mückeln 
Nerdlen 
Niederstadtfeld 
Oberstadtfeld 
Sarmersbach 
Saxler 
Schalkenmehren 
Schönbach
Schutz 
Steineberg 
Steiningen 
Strohn 
Strotzbüsch 
Udler 
Üdersdorf 
Utzerath 
Wallenborn 
Weidenbach 
Winkel

References